FIBA Oceania Championship for Women 2007 is the qualifying tournament of FIBA Oceania for the women's basketball tournament at the 2008 Summer Olympics at Beijing. The tournament was a three-way contest between:

 (The winner of the Pacific Games held in Apia, Samoa)

It was held in Dunedin, New Zealand from 26 to 29 September.

 has already qualified for Beijing as winners of the 2006 World Championship.

The other took part in the World Olympic Qualifying Tournament in June, 2008.

Pacific Games 
The Pacific Games basketball tournament was held in Apia, Samoa from 29 August to 7 September.

The tournament was played as a single round robin with the top two teams finishing on top of the ladder play-off to determine who advanced to the FIBA Oceania Championship in Dunedin, New Zealand

Standings

Preliminary round

Playoffs

Schedule

Preliminary round

Final

Olympic qualification
Since Australia are the defending world champions, they qualified outright to the Olympics. Therefore, the berth reserved for Oceanian champions (Australia) went to New Zealand. The Oceanian runners'-up berth to the FIBA World Olympic Qualifying Tournament for Women went to Fiji.
 qualified as world champions.
 qualified as Oceanian runners-up.
 qualified to the FIBA World Olympic Qualifying Tournament for Women 2008.

External links 
 2007 FIBA Oceania Championships home page

2007
2007 in women's basketball
2007 in New Zealand basketball
Women
2007–08 in Australian basketball
2007 in Australian women's sport
2007 in Fijian sport
International basketball competitions hosted by New Zealand
Basket